A manager is an administrator of an organization.

Manager or Manage may also refer to:

Professions
 Bid manager, an executive sales role within an organization, responsible for managing bids
 Business manager, for businesses
 Campaign manager, in politics
 Manager (baseball), head coach of a professional baseball team
 Manager (association football), for association football
 Coach (sport), in other sports
 Manager (professional wrestling)
 Talent manager, for entertainers

Other uses
 Manage, Belgium, a Walloon municipality in Hainaut, Belgium
 Manager (Gaelic games), a coach of a Gaelic games team, most notably in Gaelic football and hurling
 ManaGeR, an early windowing system
 Manager (Mac OS), a component of the Mac OS operating system
 Manager Daily, a Thai newspaper
 "The Manager", less frequently known as "The Manager's Speech", a video and spoken-word B-side by Bill Drummond

See also 
 General manager, for managing both the revenue and cost elements of an organization
 Project manager, for individual projects
 Program manager
 Branch (banking)
 Majordomo, the highest person on a household staff
 Supervisor
 Managing director
 Management (disambiguation)